Bernard Woma (18 December 1966 - 27 April 2018) was a well-known Dagara gyile player from Upper West Ghana who spent many years teaching the instrument and introducing it to audiences around the world. Woma earned two master's degrees in African Studies and Ethnomusicology at Indiana University. He was xylophonist and lead drummer of the National Dance Company of Ghana and of Saakumu Dance Troupe. He performed with New York Philharmonic, South Dakota Symphony Orchestra, the Minnesota Orchestra and the Albany Symphony Orchestra as well as Berliner Symphoniker in Berlin, Germany, and KwaZulu Natal Symphony Orchestra in Durban, South Africa. He performed his gyil concerto composition "Gyil Nyog Me Na" in 2006 at Zankel Hall in Carnegie Hall, New York. He also founded Dagara Music and Arts Center in Accra, Ghana.

Signed to the Jumbie Records label, he released the live album Bernard Woma in Concert on the label in 2003. In 2009, he released the studio album Crossroad on the Chris Wabich label. He formed the Bernard Woma Ensemble with musicians Kofi Ameyaw and Mark Stone and master dancers Sulley Imoro and Peace Elewonu. Gyile is a type of West African xylophone, with seventeen keys constructed over gourds. It holds a place in the musical traditions of the Dagara and Birifor people of northern Ghana and southern Burkina Faso.

Discography

Albums
2003: Crossroad duo with Chris Wabich
2007: Live at the Pito Bar
2009: Bernard Woma in Concert
2013: Missa Yielu (Dagara Catholic Mass)
Before 2003: The Flow of Time

References

1966 births
2018 deaths
20th-century Ghanaian musicians
21st-century Ghanaian musicians
Indiana University Bloomington alumni
People from Upper West Region